Daljine is the debut solo studio album by Serbian singer-songwriter Bojana Vunturišević. Released on April 21, 2017, under Mascom Records, it was announced with the release of its lead single "Kese, etikete" on March 10, 2017. Daljine represents her first body of work since Vunturišević 
parted her ways with the band Svi na pod! and pursued a solo career. The production on Daljine was handled by Vunturišević's past band member, Ivan Mirković Bambi.

Daljine  received positive reviews from music critics. On 29 April, the album was promoted with a live show at the Bitef theater in Belgrade.

Critical reception

In a four out of five star review, Siniša Miklaužić from Muzika.hr wrote that Vunturišević stayed true to her electropop roots with Svi na pod!, which can be best seen on the track "Bes". However, according to him, Daljine was more lyrics-focused than her previous work with the band. Miklaužić was particularly favorable of the track "Kese, etikete", compering the "contemporary electropop" sound to the music of New Zealand singer Lorde. Moreover, the critic highlighted the social commentary in the songs "Kese, etikete" and "E70". Ultimately, Miklaužić stated: "At her debut, Bojana showed that she understands extremely well who her audience is and how she should present herself to them".

Balkanrock enlisted Daljine among the top 30 best regional releases from 2017, while Muzika.hr placed the album at number two on their review of 2017.

Track listing

Personnel
Musicians
 Bojana Vunturišević - lead vocals, keyboards
 Andrijana Belović - background vocals 
 Anjuta Janković - background vocals 
 Marija Stojanović - background vocals
 Milica Tegeltija - background vocals 
 Minja Bogavac - background vocals
 Nebojša Zulfikarpašić Keba - guitar
 Ivan Mirković Bambi - guitar, keyboards
 Jamal Al Kiswani - saxophone

Technical
 Ivan Mirković Bambi - production
 Marko Kon - mastering
 Bojana Vunturišević - arrangement

Art
 Milica Mrvić - photography, design

Release history

References

2017 debut albums